Sir Richard Horner Paget, 1st Baronet (14 March 1832 – 3 February 1908) was a British Conservative politician who sat in the House of Commons from 1865 to 1895.

Paget was the son of John Moore Paget of Cranmore, Somerset and his wife Elizabeth Jane Doveton. He attended the Royal Military College, Sandhurst and was a captain in the 66th Regiment and Honorary lieutenant-colonel of the 3rd Volunteer Battalion, Prince Albert's (Somersetshire) Light Infantry. He was a J.P. and deputy lieutenant for Somerset.

In the 1865 general election, Paget was elected Conservative Member of Parliament for East Somerset. However, at the 1868 general election, he was elected instead for Mid Somerset and held the seat until it was reorganised under the Redistribution of Seats Act 1885. He was then elected in the 1885 general election as MP for Wells, which he held until the 1895 general election.

Paget was made a Baronet in 1886, and sworn as a Privy Councillor in 1895.

Paget married Caroline Isabel Surtees in 1866. He was succeeded in the baronetcy by his son Richard Paget. His daughter, Dorothy Mary Paget, married the Liberal politician Herbert Gladstone, 1st Viscount Gladstone.

The scientist Brigid Balfour was one of his granddaughters.

References

External links 
 

1832 births
1908 deaths
Paget, Sir Richard, 1st Baronet
Members of the Privy Council of the United Kingdom
Members of the Parliament of the United Kingdom for English constituencies
UK MPs 1865–1868
UK MPs 1868–1874
UK MPs 1874–1880
UK MPs 1880–1885
UK MPs 1885–1886
UK MPs 1886–1892
UK MPs 1892–1895